The Mayor's Cup is the football rivalry between the Missouri Tigers and the South Carolina Gamecocks.

The two schools are 714 miles apart, however both school campuses are located in cities named Columbia. The two teams have met twelve times, and Missouri leads the series 8–5.

The cup itself is a trophy awarded by the mayors of Columbia, South Carolina and Columbia, Missouri.

Pre-SEC
The first meeting between Missouri and South Carolina occurred in the 1979 Hall of Fame Classic bowl game in Birmingham, Alabama and the game MVP was Missouri quarterback Phil Bradley. The second meeting happened in the 2005 Independence Bowl, which took place in Shreveport, Louisiana. South Carolina got out to an early lead scoring 21 points in the first quarter, but was out scored in the remaining three quarters losing 38–31.

SEC
On November 6, 2011, Missouri left the Big 12 and joined the Southeastern Conference during the 2010–2013 Big 12 Conference realignment. They joined the SEC Eastern division, the same division as South Carolina, and the two teams now face each other every year. 

In 2012, the first year both teams were SEC members, South Carolina were ranked seventh in the country, reached the largest margin of victory during the series winning 31–10. 

In 2013, both teams were ranked in the top 25 for the first time in the matchup. Missouri scored the game's first 17 points and South Carolina scored the next 17 in the fourth quarter to tie the game and head into overtime. Both teams scored a touchdown in the first overtime, South Carolina started the second overtime with a quick three and out leading to a field goal. Missouri got the ball next and also went three and out and lead to a Andrew Baggett field goal attempt. The ball was hiked from the long snapper to the holder and has the ball with the laces facing the kicker, Baggett kicks the ball ricocheting off the left goal post resulting in a South Carolina win in double OT 27–24. Both teams would finish the season ranked in the AP Top 5 (South Carolina at No. 4 and Missouri at No. 5).

In 2014, ESPN's College Gameday broadcast from the University of South Carolina campus ahead of the matchup. In 2017, the rivalry was the featured game of the week as SEC Network's SEC Nation show broadcast from Francis Quadrangle at MU.

In 2019, Missouri wide receiver Richaud Floyd declared the game a "grown man" rivalry due to the physicality of the games.

The rivalry has been defined by streaks, with the teams trading off back-to-back wins then three wins in a row for South Carolina and currently four wins in a row for Missouri.

Game results

See also
 List of NCAA college football rivalry games

References